GAGFAH (Gemeinnützige Aktiengesellschaft für Angestellten-Heimstätten) was a Luxembourg-based realty company. It owned a portfolio of more than 145,000 rental units in Germany, particularly concentrated in Dresden and Berlin.

Around 28% of the company was owned by various funds managed by the Fortress Investment Group.

In 2015, GAGFAH merged with Deutsche Annington and was renamed Vonovia.

References

External links

Real estate companies of Luxembourg